La Salle County refers to two counties and one parish in the United States, each named for French explorer René-Robert Cavelier, Sieur de La Salle:

LaSalle County, Illinois
LaSalle Parish, Louisiana
La Salle County, Texas